The Potosi School District is a school district that serves Potosi, Tennyson, and surrounding areas in Wisconsin. As of 2009, the district administrator was Dr. Steven C. Lozeau.

The school has had a difficult time meeting funding needs over the past decade. In 2000, voters approved a $1 million building project to add and remodel classrooms in the elementary and high schools, after rejecting four previous referendums. In 2006, voters in the district narrowly voted to exceed the state-imposed revenue limit by $150,000 in a 389 to 387 vote. At one time, the school principal even resorted to scrounging for scrap metal to install lights on the football field.

Demographics
The district served 378 students in the 2008–2009 school year. The students of the district were 99.7% white and 0.3% black.

Schools
[[Pot 
High School]]
Potosi School
Potosi Elementary School

References

External links
Potosi School District website
District profile from GreatSchools.net
Profile from the state of Wisconsin

Education in Grant County, Wisconsin
School districts in Wisconsin